The Société des traversiers du Québec (STQ) is a ferry company which has operated some intra-provincial ferry services in Quebec since 1971. It is a crown corporation owned by the Government of Quebec.

STQ operates the following services:

 Saint-Ignace-de-Loyola to Sorel-Tracy, crossing the St. Lawrence River with two boats, the N.M. Catherine-Legardeur and the N.M. Lucien-L.
 Lévis to Quebec City, crossing the St. Lawrence River with two twin boats, the N.M. Alphonse-Desjardins and the N.M. Lomer-Gouin.
 Tadoussac to Baie-Sainte-Catherine, crossing the Saguenay River with three boats, the N.M. Armand-Imbeau and the N.M. Jos-Deschênes all year long and the N.M. Félix-Antoine-Savard in the summer.
 Matane to Baie-Comeau and Godbout, crossing the St. Lawrence River with one boat, the M.V. Saaremaa I, which replaced the M.V. F.-A.-Gauthier, when that ferry was taken out of service due to engine issues.  The M.V. F.A. Gauthier had replaced N.M. Camille-Marcoux in 2015.  The M.V.  F.-A.-Gauthier is the first ferry in North American service powered by liquified natural gas.
L'Isle-aux-Coudres to Les Éboulements, crossing the St. Lawrence River with two boats, the N.M. Joseph-Savard and the N.M. Radisson.
Chevery to Harrington Harbour, with N.M. Mécatina II.

The following services are operated in partnership with another company:

 Saint-Antoine-de-l'Isle-aux-Grues to Montmagny crossing the St. Lawrence River with one boat, the N.M. Grues-des-Îles
 Rivière-du-Loup to Saint-Siméon crossing the St. Lawrence River with one boat, the N.M. Trans-Saint-Laurent
 Île-d'Entrée to Cap-aux-Meules connecting two islands of the Magdalen Islands with one  boat, the N.M. Ivan-Quinn, built in 2009.

New construction
On January 12, 2010, the corporation announced the signing of contracts for three new ferries. Concept Naval of Quebec City and STX Canada will design two ferries which will replace the existing ferries on the Tadoussac - Baie Sainte-Catherine route, the N.M. Armand-Imbeau and the N.M. Jos-Deschênes. These ferries are currently under construction at Chantier Davie Canada in Lévis, Quebec. As of May 2018, the new ferries had not entered service and their projected cost had more than doubled the original estimate.  One ferry is presently projected to enter service in Summer 2018 and the other in Fall 2018.

The company Navtech Deltamarin (a joint venture of Navtech and Deltamarin Group), also of Quebec City, contracted to build the ferry which replaced the N.M. Camille Marcoux on the Matane – Baie-Comeau – Godbout route. This vessel was constructed by Italian shipbuilder Fincantieri. All three new ferries are to be powered by liquefied natural gas (LNG).

See also 
 Compagnie de gestion de Matane
 Roll-on/roll-off

References

External links 
 
  

Ferry companies of Quebec
Companies based in Quebec City
Crown corporations of Quebec